Nias (Nias language: Tanö Niha) (sometimes called Little Sumatra in English) is an island located off the western coast of Sumatra, Indonesia. Nias is also the name of the archipelago of which the island is the centre, but also includes the Batu Islands to the south-east and the small Hinako Islands to the west. There were 756,338 inhabitants on the island (including the Batu Islands and minor offshore islands) at the 2010 Census; at the 2015 Census this had risen to 798,506 and the 2020 Census resulted in a total of 880,550. The official estimate as at mid 2022 was 902,632.

Geography and history

This chain, which resurfaces in Nusa Tenggara in the mountainous islands of Sumba and Timor, is the forearc of the South Sumatra Basin along the Sunda Trench subduction zone.

At Nias the oceanic plate is being obliquely subducted under the Sunda Plate at the rapid rate of  a year (Milsom).

History 
The first inhabitants of Nias were Australomelanesoid people which can be traced back as early as 10,000 BC. They were later superseded by the Austronesian people which ultimately originate from Taiwan. The name of the island derives from the word used by the islanders to refer to themselves, niha ("human"). In the local language (Li Niha), the island is called Tanö Niha (literally the land of humans).

World War II 
During World War II, Nias was briefly occupied by an unrecognized Nazi state proclaimed by a group of escaped German prisoners calling themselves the Free Republic of Nias.

Tsunami and earthquakes of 2004 and 2005

On 28 March 2005, the island was again hit by the 2005 Nias–Simeulue earthquake, initially presumed to be an aftershock of the 2004 quake, but now regarded as the second most powerful earthquake ever recorded in Indonesia and among the top 10 most powerful recorded worldwide since 1900. At least 800 people were reported dead, with the possibility of more than 2,000 casualties.  Hundreds of buildings were toppled and many thousands of people were made homeless. In 2007, almost two years after the earthquake, there were still tens of thousands of internally displaced persons living in camps throughout Nias.

Nias's coastline has changed markedly with the tsunami and earthquake. In other areas, as much as a further  of land is exposed. Uplift of land as much as  has been recorded.

Following the earthquake, many international aid agencies moved in to assist in rehabilitation and reconstruction efforts. Oxfam, International Aid, Giving Children Hope, Save the Children Fund, World Vision, Surf Aid, Safe Harbor International and Caritas International are some of the international NGOs represented in Nias. UN agencies represented include UNORC – Office of the UN Recovery Coordinator for Aceh and Nias, UNDP, UNICEF, UN-Habitat, WFP, IOM and UNIDO.

Administration

Nias is the largest of the islands off Sumatra that are part of North Sumatra province. This archipelago consists of 131 islands, of which Nias Island is the biggest. The population in this area was 756,762 inhabitants at the 2010 Census, including Ono Niha (the indigenous inhabitants of the island), Malay, Batak, and Chinese; by the 2020 Census the population had risen to 880,550, and the official estimate for mid 2022 was 902,632.

Until 2003 Nias was a single administrative regency (kabupaten) covering the entire island, part of the province of North Sumatra. In 2003 it was split into two regencies, Nias and Nias Selatan (South Nias).  Subsequently, the island was divided further, with the creation of two further regencies from parts of the former Nias Regency – Nias Barat (West Nias) and Nias Utara (North Nias) – and the designation of Gunungsitoli as an autonomous city independent of the four regencies. Gunungsitoli remains the center of the business affairs of the entire island. Teluk Dalam is the capital of Nias Selatan Regency, Lötu of Nias Utara Regency, Lahömi of Nias Barat Regency, and Gidö of Nias Regency.

All parties in the North Sumatra Legislative Council have agreed to the formation of a Nias Island province (comprising Nias, Nias Selatan, Nias Utara and Nias Barat regencies, and Gunungsitoli municipality). It has been approved at a regional plenary session on 2 May 2011, but still awaits approval from Central government, which has not yet enacted the grand design for additional provinces. The new province will thus cover an area identical to the original Nias Regency prior to the latter's division in 2003. Apart from Nias Island itself, the province will include the smaller Batu Islands (Pulau-pulau Batu) to the south, lying between Nias and Siberut; the Batu Islands form seven administrative districts within South Nias Regency.

 # South Nias Regency includes the Batu Islands.

Culture

The isolated Nias Island chain has been trading since prehistory with other cultures, other islands, and even mainland Asia. Some historians and archaeologists have cited the local culture as one of the few remaining Megalithic cultures in existence today. While this point of view is hotly debated, there is no doubt that Nias' relative geographic isolation has created a unique culture. Nias is best known for its diversity of festivals and celebration. The most well-known events are War Dances, performed regularly for tourists, and Stone Jumping, a manhood ritual that sees young men leaping over two meter stone towers to their fate. In the past the top of the stone board is covered with spikes and sharp pointed bamboo. The music of Nias, performed mostly by women, is noted worldwide for its haunting beauty.

Gunungsitoli is home to Nias's only museum, the Museum Pusaka Nias (Nias Heritage Foundation), which houses over 6000 objects related to Nias's cultural heritage.  The museum had recently built a new building and had improved their storage and exhibitions when the 2004 earthquake and tsunami occurred.   The museum suffered some damage to the grounds and collections, but museum staff are working to recover from this devastating event

The predominant religion is Protestant Christianity. Six out of seven Niasans are Protestant; the remainder are about evenly divided between Muslim (mostly immigrants from elsewhere in Indonesia) and Catholic.  However adherence to either Christian or Muslim religions is still largely symbolic; Nias continues into current day celebrating its own indigenous culture and traditions as the primary form of spiritual expression.

The people of Nias build Omo Hada houses on massive ironwood pillars with towering roofs. Not only were they almost impregnable to attack in former tribal warfare, their flexible nail-less construction provide proven earthquake durability.

Nias is home not only to a unique human culture but also endemic fauna which differ from other areas of North Sumatra because of the island's remote location separate from Sumatra.

Transportation
To reach Nias, there is a weekly ship from Jakarta to Gunungsitoli; there were ferries from Sibolga to Gunungsitoli, Teluk Dalam, or Lahewa every day; before the Asian financial crisis hit Indonesia, there was a daily flight from Medan to Gunungsitoli.  This became less frequent following the crisis.

Since the 1998 Reformation, however, transport links on and to the island have become poor. Internally, the road system is in a very bad condition. Externally the air and ferry links are unreliable. There are two ferry terminals (Gunungsitoli and Teluk Dalam) and an airport (Binaka, near Gunungsitoli) on the island, serviced mainly from Sibolga and Medan respectively. However, local ferry companies regularly go out of business (or their boats sink), so only one terminal may be active at any given time.  Since the 2005 earthquake, transportation has improved to cope with the increase in travel needs for reconstruction and rehabilitation efforts. Wings Air and Manunggal Air are the airlines that fly to Gunungsitoli.

National flag carrier Garuda Indonesia was set to operate a new service from Jakarta to Nias in North Sumatra starting 15 November 2018. This direct flight  allows travelers to visit the regency's capital Gunung Sitoli. Using the CRJ Bombardier 1000 Next-Gen that can accommodate 96 passengers, the route  operates three times a week, on Tuesday, Thursday and Saturday.

Surfing

Nias is an internationally famous surfing destination.  The best known surfing area is Sorake Bay, close to the town of Teluk Dalam, on the southern tip. Enclosed by the beaches of Lagundri and Sorake, the bay has both left and right-hand breaks.  As they wait for waves, surfers can often see sea turtles swimming below.  There are also two consistent, world-class waves in the nearby Hinako Islands, Asu and Bawa.  Many lesser-known, high-quality surf spots with low crowds await adventurous travelers.

Nias was part of the famous Hippie trail of the 1960s, particularly traveled by surfers, which led to Bali. It has been the site of several international surfing competitions in the past, particularly before the 1998 Indonesian Reformation Movement.

Despite the storied history of surfing in Nias, international surfing in Nias has slowed down especially (but not specifically) due to the earthquakes of December 2004 and January 2005. The situation has since been gradually improving, however.

Gallery

See also

 List of islands of Indonesia
 Mentawai people
 Nias Expedition
 Omo sebua

References

Bibliography

External links

Nias Island Website
Nias Online
Nias Bangkit

Landforms of North Sumatra
Islands of Sumatra
Headhunting
Populated places in Indonesia